GFK Tikvesh 1930, commonly referred to as Tikvesh, is a professional football club from Kavadarci, North Macedonia, that currently competes in the Macedonian First League. After playing at different home grounds in the early years, the club moved to Gradski Stadion Kavadarci on 19 March 1950 and have remained there since.

The 'golden age' of the club came in the late 1960s and lasted throughout the entire 1970s. Tikvesh had won the Macedonian Republic League twice (1971–72; 1977–78), and they have competed in the Yugoslav Second League for five seasons (1955–56; 1968–69; 1969–70; 1972–73; 1978–79). Tikvesh was one of the 18 founding members of the Macedonian First League in 1992. The club's traditional colours are red and white, they are nicknamed the Winegrowers and they have contested the Winegrowers Derby with their neighbouring rivals FK Vardar Negotino, although Tikvesh have predominantly played in higher league so their meetings have only been sporadic.

History

Foundation and early years

Tikvesh was founded on 21 December 1930 by a group of young enthusiasts who held their meeting in the Balkan restaurant in Kavadarci. Slavcho Temkov became the first president of the newly formed club, Todor Janakiev was chosen as secretary while Aleksandar Hadzhivasilev was the first main sponsor.

The club's early years were mostly spent playing friendly matches with other teams from Kavadarci and some neighbouring towns. At this early stage Tikvesh was overshadowed by the other football clubs from Kavadarci, such as FK Zanaetchiski, FK Ljubash, FK Jugoslavija and FK Strasho Pindzhur, but after the resumption of football following World War II Tikvesh were admitted into the Football League and the club established itself. In 1948–49 Tikvesh achieved a 6th-place finish in the Macedonian Republic League, level on points with 5th placed FK Shar Tetovo but weaker goal difference.

1950s and 1960s (Vuko Karov's era)
First taste of success

The club made its first notable achievements in the 1950s.

In 1950 the Football Association of Yugoslavia based in Belgrade made a decision to create a unified third tier football league in Yugoslavia. Tikvesh started their qualification campaign for the Yugoslav Third League with a 4–2 win against FK Crvena Dzvezda (Veles), followed by a 3–1 win over FK Goce Delchev (Prilep). These two wins gave Tikvesh a chance to play further in two-legged play-off games. But they failed to qualify in the Yugoslav Third League after losing 4–1 (home) and 7–1 (away) to Rudar, and 11–0 (away) and 4–1 (home) to Radnički, who later went on to win the Yugoslav Third League and were promoted to the Yugoslav Second League alongside Rudar. The 11–0 trashing by Radnički is Tikvesh's biggest ever defeat. After failing to qualify in the Yugoslav Third League, Tikvesh continued the season in the Macedonian Republic League and achieved a respectable 3rd-place finish, behind champions FK Rabotnik Bitola and second placed FK Goce Delchev (Prilep).

During the 1950s and 1960s the league system was changed several times and the Macedonian Republic League was often divided into three parallel divisions (Shtip, Bitola, Skopje), at the end of the seasons the winners of each division played in the play-off finals to decide the Macedonian Champion. Tikvesh won the Shtip Division in 1952–53 but lost in the play-off finals and missed out on a chance to be crowned champions for the first time. The following season they came agonisingly close to winning the title. With two losses in their final three games of the season including a 4–0 loss to the eventual champions in the penultimate game, Tikvesh finished as runners-up to FK Pobeda Prilep in the Macedonian Republic League trailing by 4 points.  The 1954–55 season was successful for Tikvesh despite finishing third in the table in the Macedonian Republic League, level on points with Pobeda Prilep and just three points behind Metalec Skopje. This was seen as a good result as they were promoted to the Yugoslav IV Zona (2nd tier football league in Yugoslavia at the time) for the first time in its existence. The club's stay in the Yugoslav IV Zona was short-lived as they were relegated the following season, together with Rabotnik Bitola, Borac Čačak and Bregalnica Shtip, while Vardar Skopje won the league and were promoted to the Yugoslav First League.

After relegation from the Yugoslav IV Zona, Tikvesh went on to win comfortably the Shtip Division in 1956–57 with some high-scoring road wins while registering 14 wins-2 draws-2 losses. Consistency followed in the next season, as the side led in attack by Vuko Karov and Blazho Malinkov finished as runners-up to Belasica Strumica in the Shtip Division only on goal difference.

In the early and mid 1960s Tikvesh were second-best on four occasions in the Macedonian Republic League (1962–63 – 1st FK Pobeda Prilep, 1964–65 – 1st FK Teteks Tetovo, 1965–66 – 1st FK Rabotnichki Skopje, 1967–68 – 1st FK Rabotnichki Skopje).

In 1967–68 Tikvesh finished as runners-up to Rabotnichki Skopje in the Macedonian Republic League, but had done enough to gain promotion to the Yugoslav Second League – East. In 1968–69 Tikvesh avoided relegation from the Yugoslav Second League – East and finished just a single point ahead of Ei Mladost Niš, securing survival with one game to go after a late run of good results. Angel Kimov and Gligor Totov combined for a respectable 18 league goals (Kimov 10 and Totov 8), while Miodrag Aleksić, a winter loan signing from FK Vojvodina scored 6 goals. They failed to establish themselves in the Yugoslav Second League – East and to avoid the drop in the 1969–70 season.

Golden 1970s
Led by the renowned goalscorer Angel Kimov and under the guidance of manager Nakjo Totovski Tikvesh claimed their first major honour in 1971–72 winning the Macedonian Republic League.  The striking partnership Kimov – Totov combined 36 goals throughout the season (Kimov 20 and Totov 16) to help Tikvesh win its first league title for 42 years and to get promotion to the Yugoslav Second League – East. In the next season, they came straight back down to the Macedonian Republic League after finishing 15th out of 18 teams, the position which would have guaranteed survival in the previous seasons, but due to drastic changes in the Yugoslav football league system in 1973 Tikvesh were relegated from the Yugoslav Second League – East.

On their return to the Macedonian Republic League in 1973–74 Tikvesh achieved 3rd place whilst in the next season (1974–75) they went one place better and finished as runners-up to FK Pelister Bitola.

Tikvesh won their second title in 1977–78 and with it came yet another promotion to the Yugoslav Second League – East. Angel Kimov scored an impressive 34 goals in 34 matches which made him the league's top goalscorer, the only player to earn the honour in the club's history. The 1978–79 season saw Tikvesh compete in the Yugoslav Second League – East for the last time. After a promising start to the season including wins over Teteks (1–2), Dubočica (5–0), Jedinstvo (1–0), Sutjeska (3–0) and draws against Liria (2–2), Budućnost (0–0) their form dipped drastically and they were relegated to the Macedonian Republic League, Vardar Skopje were promoted as champions to the Yugoslav First League, a recurring scenario from 1955–56 season.

Undoubtedly Tikvesh's heyday was the 12-year period from 1967 to 1979, where they competed for four seasons in the Yugoslav Second League (1968–69, 1969–70, 1972–73 and 1978–79), were Macedonian champions twice (1971–72 and 1977–78), finished as runners-up twice (1967–68 and 1974–75) and sustained one third-place finish (1973–74).

1980s decline

After the successful 1970s the club's fortunes declined in the 1980s. In 1980–81, despite beginning the season as one of the favourites to win the title Tikvesh suffered an unprecedented run of poor results, culminating in their first-ever relegation to the Macedonian Republic 2nd division, bringing to a close one of the most memorable periods in Tikvesh's history.  For two seasons in a row they failed to achieve promotion, Tikvesh struggled in 1981–82 and 1982–83 only finishing 4th and 5th in the table respectively. In the meantime Petar Angjushev guided FK Bor Kavadarci to back-to-back promotions. FK Bor have won the Macedonian Republic 3rd division in 1981–82, and in 1982–83 they stormed the Macedonian Republic 2nd division winning promotion to the Macedonian Republic League at their first attempt. In their title run in 1982–83 FK Bor won 3–1 and drew 2–2 against Tikvesh, the only time in which two teams from Kavadarci faced each other in any of the top two football divisions. During the summer of 1983, after FK Bor were promoted to the Macedonian Republic League the two clubs from Kavadarci merged and FK Tikvesh continued to play in the Macedonian Republic League. Over the next few years, their form fluctuated greatly, 5th in 1983–84, 9th in 1984–85, rising to 4th in 1985–86 before dropping to 17th two seasons later in 1987–88 which meant another relegation to the Macedonian Republic 2nd division. Tikvesh achieved an instant promotion in 1988–89, followed by a 3rd-place finish in the Macedonian Republic League in 1989–90, their best season and highest league placing in a decade.

1990s and the new century
After the breakup of Yugoslavia in 1991, Tikvesh were one of the founding members of the Macedonian First League, the top-level professional football league in Macedonia. In the inaugural season they finished 7th in the table. A succession of managers followed, but despite a wealth of home grown talent and some well known signings (such as Dejvi Glavevski, Dzhevdet Shainovski, Sasho Karadzhov, Arbnor Morina, Vlado Šuvak, Đorđe Iskić) Tikvesh failed to achieve any significant results, never breaking into the top four and therefore failing to qualify for European competition.

Bankruptcy and rejuvenation

With the arrival of the new century came the darkest days of the club's existence. In 2000–01 Tikvesh were relegated from the Macedonian First League for the very first time, they recorded the Macedonian First League lowest ever points total, going through an entire season with only one win. With a drastic improvement in form the following season Tikvesh made an immediate return to the top-flight by winning the Macedonian Second League.

In a turbulent 2002–03 Tikvesh saw four different managers through the course of the season in the Macedonian First League. Despite promising performances during the first half of the season Perica Gruevski surprisingly resigned as manager on 8 November 2002, citing the bad financial situation at the club as the main reason for his departure. His assistant Lazar Iliev was appointed as a caretaker manager, and took the helm until the winter break. On 16 January 2003 Tikvesh announced that they had appointed Blagoja Kitanovski as new head coach, who only held the position for three months and resigned in April 2003. On 28 April 2003 Nikola Gligorov was appointed as the new manager of Tikvesh. After a very good start of the 2002–03 season Tikvesh comfortably avoided relegation. More pain was yet to be inflicted in the 2003–04 season when they were relegated from the Macedonian First League for a second time in four years. Following this relegation from the Macedonian First League Tikvesh fell into serious financial difficulties and a downward spiral set in.

2004–05 saw Tikvesh suffer a second consecutive relegation, placing them in the Macedonian Third League – South. They finished the 2004–05 season in 10th place (3rd from bottom) but lost the relegation play-off game to FK Karaorman Struga played at a neutral venue at Philip II Arena on 19 June 2005. The 90 minutes ended with a 0–0 draw and after 30 minutes of extra time Tikvesh lost 3–1. Shortly afterwards in 2006–07 season the club went into bankruptcy.

Eventually the club was rejuvenated under the name of FK Tikvesh Nacional, they started competing in the Regional League – OFL Kavadarci, 4th tier football league in Macedonia, achieving promotion at the first attempt in 2007–08.
In 2008–09 FK Tikvesh Nacional played in the Macedonian Third League – South and finished the season in 5th place.

In the summer of 2009 the Kavadarci Municipality Council took control of the club and changed the name to Gradski Fudbalski Klub Tikvesh (City's Football Club Tikvesh). In 2009–10 they won the Macedonian Third League – South and were promoted as champions.

In 2010–11 Tikvesh made a very good start to the season in the Macedonian Second League, but in the end they finished 3rd in the table and narrowly missed the chance to be promoted to the Macedonian First League, they lost 2–0 to FK Napredok Kichevo in the play-off final at Gjorche Petrov Stadium in Skopje. In the same season Tikvesh had their best ever Cup run. After defeating FK Drita 2–1 in the first round and FK Osogovo 3–1 on aggregate in the second round, in a memorable quarter-final Tikvesh overcame a 4–1 first-leg deficit to defeat FK Vardar, an emphatic 4–0 win at home in the second-leg made it 5–4 on aggregate and Tikvesh went through to the semi-finals where they eventually lost to FK Teteks over two legs (0–0; 0–6).

The first half of the season in 2011–12 gave Tikvesh hope and realistic chance for promotion, they went into the winter break only 3 points behind the league leaders FK Drita. But they had started poorly in the second half of the season and on 25 March 2012 Metodija Sapundzhiev resigned as manager after three defeats in a row. Nikola Gligorov was appointed as new manager and in the end they finished 7th in the table.

After a disappointing start of 2012–13 season, 1 win-3 draws-2 losses, Tikvesh dismissed manager Nikola Gligorov on 25 September 2012 and Blagoja Kitanovski was appointed as his successor, but he stayed only until the winter break and left the club. This was Kitanovski's third short spell in Tikvesh, he previously coached the team in 2000 and 2003.
The club's precarious financial situation was obvious and during the winter break most of the first team players left the club. Nikola Gligorov returned as manager and Tikvesh continued the season with players from the youth categories. With the lack of quality and experience in the squad Tikvesh were unable to secure survival and they were relegated to the Macedonian Third League – South.
The 2012–13 season will also be remembered for the supporters' campaign (For better Tikvesh) against the club's board of directors. They were increasingly convinced that the board was lacking ambition and football knowledge, sarcastically nicknaming the board – The Visionaries. 1930 supporters signed a petition demanding the board to step down, although there were greater levels of interest the decision was made to hand over the petition with only 1930 signatures because this number is representative of the year of Tikvesh's foundation.

Tikvesh's crisis deepened in 2013–14 season. The relations between the club's board of directors and the players (backed by the fans) deteriorated, subsequently leading to players revolt and boycott of the matches. On 9 October 2013 the FFM expelled Tikvesh from the Macedonian Third League – South after they refused to play against FK Mlekar and FK Topolchani.

After a tumultuous summer and a newly assembled board of directors, Tikvesh begun the 2014–15 season competing in the lowest rank of Macedonian football. They won the league and gained promotion to the Macedonian Third League – South through play-off matches winning comfortably 8–0 and 3–0 against FK Gemidhzii and FK Kozhuf respectively.

In 2015–16 season Tikvesh finished in 3rd place in the Third League – South. Due to the withdrawal of FK Ljubanci and FK Mladost Carev Dvor, the club was admitted to the Second League, which has seen them returning to the second rank of the Macedonian football after three years absence.

The battle for promotion to the top tier and the agony of the play-offs
Tikvesh entered the 2018–19 season with a serious ambition for promotion to the top-flight, but following an inconsistent start their automatic promotion bid fell just short in the end as they finished as runners-up to FK Borec Veles, and only managed to qualify for the play-offs. 
On 2 June 2019, in heavy rain, in a match played at Gjorche Petrov Stadium in Skopje, Tikvesh defeated FK Labunishta 6–3 in the play-off semi-final and reached the final. But the dreams of a return to the top-flight were shattered on 5 June 2019. With only 3 days for recovery while having an extended injury list Tikvesh narrowly lost (3–2) the play-off final to FK Sileks Kratovo, leaving the players and the fans heartbroken.

Return to the top flight

On 25 May 2021, after 17 years in the lower divisions Tikvesh finally secured promotion back to the Macedonian First League. They finished 2020–21 season 2nd on the table and qualified for the promotion play-off finals, where once again FK Sileks Kratovo was their opponent. The match took place at National Arena Toshe Proeski in Skopje and Tikvesh won the match 1-0 courtesy of an Ediz Spahiu goal early in the second half.

Colours
The club's colours have traditionally been red and white. In the early years Tikvesh played in red and white striped shirts,  but for much of its history they have been playing in red shirts with white collar or white V-neck.  In the mid-90s Tikvesh played a couple of seasons in red and white hooped shirts as well.

Crest
Throughout the years Tikvesh have had two main crests.

The current crest, also used until the early 1990s is a green vine-leaf on a white background, surrounded by red lines, and the name of the club written with green letters on the top. The vine-leaf represents the Tikvesh region famous for its vineyards, while red and white are the official colours of the club and the colours of Kavadarci.

Stadium

Tikvesh's home ground is the City Stadium of Kavadarci. The stadium was built in the late 1940s and the first match played was on 19 March 1950 between FK Tikvesh and NK Rudar Trbovlje from Slovenia, qualification for the Yugoslav Third League, the final score was 1–4 for the visitors from Slovenia.

The stadium has hosted the first ever Macedonia U-21 international fixture, a 7–0 win over Estonia U-21 played on 31 May 1994, also the Macedonian Cup final between FK Sileks and FK Sloga Jugomagnat (4–1) on 28 May 1997.

Although used primarily for football the stadium has hosted many concerts in the past as well.

Supporters

Tikvesh's organized supporters are known as Lozari (Winegrowers), they were formed in 1991 and traditionally occupy the East Stand at the stadium. The behavioural tendency of Lozari includes the use of football scarves, flags, flares and smoke bombs, also displaying banners and fanatical vocal support throughout the matches.  Lozari have a good relations with Chkembari, supporters of FK Pelister Bitola.

Tikvesh is one of the clubs with the highest average home attendance in Macedonia.

Rivalry
Tikvesh's fiercest rival is FK Vardar Negotino. The matches between the two clubs are known as the Winegrowers Derby, and they are keenly contested affairs with considerable pride at stake that goes far beyond football.  The derby is an inter-town rivalry, with the two towns of Kavadarci and Negotino just 10 km (6 miles) apart. The derby is seldom played because in many seasons the two clubs have played in separate divisions of the league system. Whenever played, the derby attracts bumper crowds with passionate atmosphere. In many seasons Tikvesh have enjoyed being in a superior division to their neighbours, and statistically are by far the more successful of the two clubs who have still not faced each other in the Macedonian First League. Despite numerous previous "friendly" encounters, the first official league meeting between the clubs took place on 22 March 1953 in Negotino, which ended in a 1–1 draw. The highest scoring Winegrowers league derby was played in 1961–62 when Tikvesh won 6–4 in an exciting ding-dong battle, while biggest win is Tikvesh's 5–0 victory in 1973–74.

Players

First team

 (on loan from ZTE)

Out on loan

Notable former players
To appear in this section a player must have either:
Has been part of a Tikvesh team which won a league trophy (Macedonian First League).
Set a club record or won an individual award while at the club.
Has been a long term club captain.
Has been part of the Macedonia national football team or other national football team in any official match.

 Risto Joskov - Topot
 Vuko Karov
 Petar Angjushev
 Angel Kimov
 Gligor Totov
 Angel Nastev
 Nikola Kamchev
 Blazho Malinkov
 Tome Hadzhivasilev
 Ordancho Milkov
 Pane Nedev
 Branko Boshkovski
 Blagoj Boshkovski
 Borche Mitrev
 Dejvi Glavevski
 Dzhevdet Shainovski
 Daniel Mojsov
 Vanche Shikov
 Milovan Petrovikj

Notable former coaches

 Nakjo Totovski
 Trajche Kovachev
 Andon Donchevski
 Svetozar Gođevac
 Perica Gruevski
 Blagoja Kitanovski

Honours and Achievements

Macedonian Cup

Tikvesh still haven't won the Macedonian Cup, their best performance was reaching the semi-finals in 2010–11.

R1 = first round / R2 = second round
QF = quarter-finals / SF = semi-finals
h = home / a = away

Recent seasons

1The 2019–20 season was abandoned due to the COVID-19 pandemic in North Macedonia.

Records

Most Goals:

Most league goals by a player in one season:

Most goals by a player in one match:

Vuko Karov Tournament
An annual International Memorial Tournament has been held in Kavadarci since 1993 in honour and memory of Tikvesh's former player and president Vuko Karov (5 September 1931 – 6 June 1990). The tournament is usually played in February and is considered to be the most prestigious friendly tournament in Macedonia. The knockout format includes the traditional four-team, two-days event, Single-elimination tournament system with a Third place playoff taking place before the Final. The first Vuko Karov Tournament took place on 27–28 February 1993, first teams to participate were Tikvesh, Vardar, Pobeda and SAK Klagenfurt. Vardar defeated Tikvesh in the final 3–0 and became the first winner, while Ljupcho Markovski was chosen as the tournament MVP.

Tikvesh finally won the trophy in 2011 after 14 attempts, they defeated Vardar 5–4 on penalties after a 1–1 draw at the end of 90 minutes.

Tournament not held in 2004, 2005, 2007, 2008, 2009, 2013, 2014 and 2020

See also
List of Macedonian football champions

References and notes

Bibliography
Books

Karovski, Ilija; (1996) (in Macedonian). ФК Тиквеш 1930–1995 (FK Tikvesh 1930–1995).

External links

Club Info at MacedonianFootball 
Football Federation of Macedonia 

 
Football clubs in North Macedonia
Football clubs in Yugoslavia
Association football clubs established in 1930
1930 establishments in Yugoslavia